Rafael Félix Rivelles Guillén (23 December 1898 — 3 December 1971) was a Spanish actor born in El Cabañal (El Cabanyal), a small town in the province of Valencia, Spain. Son of play actor José Rivelles and play actress Amparo Guillén, he was the father of famous Spanish star Amparo Rivelles. In the 1930s, with the advent of talking films, he went to Hollywood to make Spanish-language versions of American films, but eventually came back to Spain.

Rivelles had two especially notable roles - the title role in Don Quijote de la Mancha, and the Prior in Marcelino pan y vino (1955). He died in Madrid on 3 December 1971 and was interred at the El Cabanyal Cemetery in Valencia along with his father.

Filmography

 1914 : Prueba trágica
 1930 : El Embrujo de Sevilla (The Witch of Seville)
 1931 : El Proceso de Mary Dugan
 1931 : The Charm of Seville
 1931 : La Mujer X (Lady X) : Luis Floriot
 1931 : ¿Conoces a tu mujer? : Robert Felton
 1931 : Mamá (film) (Mommy) : Santiago
 1932 : The Man Who Laughed at Love
 1932 : Fog 
 1933 : El Café de la Marina : (Castilian version)
 1936 : Nuestra Natacha : Lalo
 1938 : Carmen, la de Triana
 1939 : Carmen fra i rossi : Saverio (Spanish version)
 1940 : The Sin of Rogelia Sanchez : Don Fernando
 1940 : Santa Rogelia
 1942 : Capitán Tormenta : Lachinsky
 1942 : Capitan Tempesta (Captain Storm) : Lachinsky
 1942 : Il Leone di Damasco (The Lion of Damascus) : Lachinsky
 1942 : Goyescas (Goyesque)
 1944 : Lessons in Good Love 
 1947 : Don Quixote : Don Quijote (Don Quixote)
 1954 : Judas' Kiss : Judas Iscariote
 1954 : He Died Fifteen Years Ago : Coronel Acuña
 1955 : Marcelino pan y vino: El Padre Superior
 1961 : La rivolta degli schiavi (Revolt of the Slaves) : Rutilius (Rutilio)
 1964 : El Señor de La Salle (Master of the Halls) : Cardenal Noailles
 1964 : Cyrano et d'Artagnan : Cardinal Duc de Richelieu
 1966 : El Greco : Marquis of Villena

Theatre

 Reinar después de morir (1964)
Cuidado con las personas formales (1960)
Papá se enfada por todo (1959)
 La herencia (1957)
Pepa Doncel (1956)
 La herida luminosa (1955)
 La muralla (The Wall) (1954)
 La mariposa y el ingeniero (1953)
Señora ama (1953)
 Callados como muertos (1952)
 Criminal de guerra (1951).
 Al amor hay que mandarlo al colegio (1950)
 La visita que no llamó al timbre (1949)
 Carlo Monte in Monte Carlo (Carlo Monte en Monte Carlo) (1939)
 El bandido de la Sierra (Bandit of the Mountain) (1926)
 El nido ajeno (1923)

References

External links

 http://www.cervantesvirtual.com/servlet/SirveObras/12826400880173731865846/p0000020.htm Rivelles in Hollywood (Spanish)
 

Spanish male film actors
1898 births
1971 deaths
20th-century Spanish male actors